This is a list of animated feature films planned for release in the 2020s.

2020
See List of animated feature films of 2020

2021
See List of animated feature films of 2021

2022
See List of animated feature films of 2022

2023
See List of animated feature films of 2023

2024

2025

2026

2027

TBA

References

Animated
2020s